Hermogenes D. Concepcion Jr. (April 7, 1920 – November 28, 2018) is a Filipino lawyer who served as Associate Justice of the Supreme Court of the Philippines from April 18, 1975 to April 16, 1986. He was appointed by President Ferdinand Marcos.

Early life 
Hermogenes Concepcion Jr. was born on April 7, 1920 in Cabanatuan City, Nueva Ecija. He received his secondary education from the Nueva Ecija High School in 1935, Bachelor of Law from the University of the Philippines College of Law in 1941 as youngest member of the class. He joined Upsilon Sigma Phi in 1938.

Career 
He was Assistant Fiscal of Manila from 1945 to 1958, then City Fiscal of Manila from 1958 to 1963. He was appointed as Associate Justice of the Court of Appeals of the Philippines in 1963, serving until his eventual appointment to the Supreme Court. As Justice of the Supreme Court, he penned many landmark decisions, including the famous Horacio Morales case.

Upon his retirement from the Supreme Court, he ran for Congress and represented his district in Nueva Ecija for one term.

He was a Board Member of the Philippine National Construction Corporation. He was also a Chairman of the Board of Trustees of Government Service Insurance System.

Awards 
He was awarded the Philippine Legion of Honor by President Ramon Magsaysay for his successful prosecution of the politburo of the Communist Party of the Philippines.

Death 
He died on November 28, 2018 at age 98.

References 

1920 births
2018 deaths
20th-century Filipino judges
University of the Philippines alumni
Associate Justices of the Supreme Court of the Philippines